Mount Tabor is an unincorporated community in Redbank Township, Armstrong County, Pennsylvania, United States. Dry Ridge school was located nearby at

History
A post office called Mount Tabor was established in 1883 and closed that same year. The 1876 Atlas of Armstrong County, Pennsylvania shows a store at the location of Mount Tabor. The residents at that time were John C Shaffer, L. C. Shaffer, C. Shaffer, W. Harmon, and R. R. Miller.

References

Unincorporated communities in Armstrong County, Pennsylvania
Unincorporated communities in Pennsylvania